"The Pony Remark" is the second episode of the second season of the NBC sitcom Seinfeld, and the seventh episode overall. The episode was written by series co-creators Jerry Seinfeld and Larry David, based on a remark David once made.

In this episode, Jerry, at a relative's 50th-anniversary dinner, makes a remark about hating anybody who had a pony when they were a child. His remark upsets the female guest-of-honor, causing her to storm out in anger.  When the woman dies shortly after the dinner, Jerry and his friends wonder if the pony remark had something to do with her death.

The episode was the first appearance of Jerry's uncle Leo, who became a recurring character on the show. Leo was played by Len Lesser. The episode was also the first appearance of Barney Martin as Morty Seinfeld, replacing actor Phil Bruns, who had portrayed Morty in the season 1 episode "The Stake Out." "The Pony Remark" aired on January 30, 1991, and gained a Nielsen rating of 10.7/16. It gained positive responses from critics, and The New York Times considers the episode to have been a turning point for the show.

Plot
Jerry's parents, Helen and Morty Seinfeld, are staying at his apartment in New York City. Helen pressures him into coming along to the 50th anniversary dinner of Helen's second cousin Manya and her husband Isaac. Jerry does not know Manya or Isaac, so he brings Elaine along as a social buffer. During the dinner, Jerry offhandedly states that he hates people who had a pony when they were growing up. This offends Manya, as she grew up in a village in Poland where she, and most of the children, had their own ponies (hers was the pride of Kraków). Jerry tries to amend his remark, but Manya leaves the table in a huff.

The following day, Jerry receives a phone call from Uncle Leo, who informs him that Manya has died, and the funeral will be held on the same day as his softball team's championship game. Jerry, Elaine, and George ponder whether his comment was a factor in Manya's death. Feeling guilty, Jerry goes to the funeral, where he apologizes to Isaac for his remark; Isaac assures him that Manya had forgotten all about it. Isaac decides to move to Phoenix in the wake of Manya's death, and Elaine asks whether she can have their apartment. Isaac eventually tells her that Jerry's cousin Jeffrey is taking it. It starts to rain, and Jerry realizes the softball game will be postponed. The following day, the team loses the championship due to some exceptionally bad playing from Jerry, leading Elaine to speculate that Manya's spirit put a hex on him as revenge for the pony remark.

Jerry bets Kramer he will back out of a resolution to rebuild his apartment so that it has multiple flat, wooden levels instead of furniture. Kramer eventually decides not to build levels but refuses to pay Jerry, arguing that the bet is invalid because he did not attempt the renovation.

Production
This episode was written by series creators Larry David and Jerry Seinfeld and directed by Tom Cherones. This episode was based on a remark David once made during a conversation. Cherones deliberately made Elaine sit at a smaller table while directing the dinner scene. "The Pony Remark" was the first episode in which Kramer wants to gamble; it is later established that he has a gambling addiction. The idea of Elaine asking Isaac what is going to happen with his old apartment was added during rehearsals. The first table reading of the episode was held on October 24, 1990, and a run-through was held two days later. "The Pony Remark" was filmed in front of a live audience on October 30, 1990, while Seinfeld's stand-up routine was filmed one day earlier, along with the performances used in "The Ex-Girlfriend" and "The Busboy"; Seinfeld changed wardrobe between takes.

"The Pony Remark" featured the second appearance of Helen and Morty Seinfeld, who had previously appeared in the season 1 episode "The Stake Out". In "The Stake Out," Morty was portrayed by Phil Bruns, but David and Seinfeld decided they wanted the character to be harsher and re-cast him with Barney Martin, who auditioned for the part on October 15, 1990, at 12:45 PM. Martin was unaware that another actor had already established the part. Helen was portrayed by Liz Sheridan; in an early draft of the episode, her name was Adele, though this did not match her name from "The Stake Out". It was later changed back to Helen. The episode also introduced Jerry's uncle Leo, portrayed by Len Lesser, who was known for his acting in gangster films, as well as The Outlaw Josey Wales and Kelly's Heroes. When Lesser auditioned for the part on October 22, 1990, he got a lot of laughs from David, Seinfeld and casting director Marc Herschfield, but did not understand why, because he did not think his lines were funny. Herschfield stated that Lesser was the right actor for the part when Lesser had auditioned. David Fresco guest starred in the episode as Isaac. Fresco had some difficulty with his lines in the episode, and would sometimes burst into laughter during filming. Other actors who guest-starred in the episode were Rozsika Halmos, who portrayed Manya, and Milt Oberman, who played the funeral director.

Reception
"The Pony Remark" was first broadcast on American television on January 30, 1991. It gained a Nielsen rating of 10.7 and an audience share of 16. This means that 10.7% of American households watched the episode, and that 16% of all televisions in use at the time were tuned into it. The episode gained two Primetime Emmy Award nominations; Seinfeld and David were nominated for Outstanding Writing in a Comedy Series and Cherones was nominated for Outstanding Directing in a Comedy Series. Though the episode did not win either of its Emmy nominations, Seinfeld was praised for co-hosting the Emmy telecast.

Dave Kehr of The New York Times felt that "The Pony Remark" was a turning point for the show, stating that, after the first few episodes, the show "turn[ed] into something sharp and distinctive  Here, suddenly, is the tight knot of guilt and denial, of hypersensitivity and sarcastic contempt that Seinfeld would explore for the next eight years." Holly Ordway of DVD Talk considered the episode the best episode of Seinfelds second season. "The Pony Remark" is considered one of Seinfelds "classic episodes". Writing for Entertainment Weekly, critics Mike Flaherty and Mary Kaye Schilling called the episode "Seinfeld at its mordant best" and graded it with an A−.

In the book Something Ain't Kosher Here: The Rise of the "Jewish" Sitcom, Vincent Brook analyzed the episode, saying, "Jerry is made to feel guilty for his 'lethal' pony remark, whence the episode's macabre humor; yet the moral in terms of ethno-spatial identity is clear. In its violent rejection of Manya, Seinfeld has driven descent-based ethnicities (and their legacy of privation and self-sacrifice) off the face of the earth, and literally off the air. There is no place for traditional Jewishness in the hedonistic Seinfeld world, "The Pony Remark" vociferously proclaims."

David Sims of The A.V. Club gave the episode an A, calling it a "classic" and writing that it "is so damn clever in how it bonds Jerry's fears about social niceties with larger fears about mortality;" he also praised Louis-Dreyfus's acting, saying that Elaine "has an amusingly stark little bit of dialogue about death midway through the episode: 'You know, funerals always make me think about my own mortality and how I'm actually going to die someday. Me, dead. Imagine that!' I think it's probably Louis-Dreyfus' best moment of the show so far, because she's really starting to nail Elaine's declarative, vaguely imperious, self-centered tone." He also admired "the estimable Barney Martin in his first appearance as Jerry's irascible dad."

References

External links 
 

1991 American television episodes
Seinfeld (season 2) episodes
Television episodes about funerals
Television episodes written by Larry David
Television episodes written by Jerry Seinfeld